The Challenge: Ride or Dies is the thirty-eighth season of the MTV reality competition series The Challenge, featuring alumni from The Real World, Road Rules, The Challenge, Are You the One?, Big Brother, Ex on the Beach, Survivor (Turkey and U.S.), Love Island (UK and U.S.), Ultimate Beastmaster, Prince Charming, The Mole Germany, Beauty & The Nerd and Exatlon (U.S.) competing for a share at a $1 million prize. The season premiered on October 12, 2022, preceded by a launch special titled "Ready to Ride" which aired on October 10, 2022.

Contestants

Teams

Draft
The winners of the episode 9 "Haul or Nothing" challenge, Faysal & Moriah, were made team captains and drafted the remaining pairs into two separate teams of eight as part of the format change. Challengers in gray cells indicate they were designated their team after the other team captain chose their partner.

 Team colors

Format
Ride or Dies features a daily challenge, a selection process and an elimination round. This season had players competing in teams of two with their "Ride or Die", an ally they chose before the season began.
 Daily Challenge: Teams compete in a daily challenge where the winning team is immune from elimination and selects four teams to interrogate. 
 Eliminations (The Zone): The daily challenge winners must select one of the teams they interrogated to compete in the elimination round. The three unselected interrogated teams then participate in the "Draw" to determine the second team for the elimination round. The winners remain in the game while the losers are eliminated.
In episode 9, the format changed and no elimination was held after the "Haul or Nothing" challenge. Instead, the winners were appointed as team captains and split each "Ride or Die" pair to form two teams of eight. The format of the game from episodes 10 to 14 is as follows:
 Daily Challenge: Teams compete in a daily challenge where the winning team is immune from elimination and interrogates all players of the designated gender from the losing team.
 Eliminations (The Zone): The winning team individually vote for one interrogated player to compete in the elimination. The unselected interrogated players then participate in the Draw to determine the second player to compete in the elimination round. The winner remains in the game while the loser is eliminated from the main competition. However, unbeknownst to the remaining players, they still have a chance of re-entering the competition if their Ride or Die is still in.
At the end of episode 14, the team phase concluded and contestants reunited with their Ride or Die. Each eliminated contestant during the team phase returned and also reunited with their Ride or Die if they were still in the competition. Each reunited pair who had one team member eliminated then had to compete in a two-part elimination round. The pair that lost the second elimination were permanently eliminated before the game reverted back to its original format.
Twists
 The Draw: To determine the second team for the elimination round, the three unselected interrogated teams must each pull a covered dagger out of a stone. The team that pulls the dagger marked "safe" is safe and selects one of the remaining two teams to save, sending the other to compete in the elimination round against the team chosen by the daily challenge winners. From episodes 10-14, players took part in the draw as individuals instead of teams; if only two players partake in the Draw, the player who pulls the safe dagger is saved while the remaining player automatically participates in the elimination round.

Gameplay

Challenge games
Bolas for Blood: Teams must solve three math questions using their biographical information, then search a mud pit for numbered bolas and attach them on chains to form the answers. The first team to correctly answer all three questions and bring their bolas to the finish line wins.
Winners: Johnny & Ravyn
Balancing Act:  Played one team at a time. Team members swim and climb a ladder up separate shipping containers suspended above water. They must then use a rope to swing to a slanted platform at the center, then distribute their weight to pivot and level out the platform. Teams are disqualified if a team member falls into the water. The team with the fastest time wins.
Winners: Bananas & Nany
Build Me Up: Played in two heats. Teams must transfer six barrels across a field, stacking them to reach and set off flares atop three stations along the way. The team that sets off all three flares and transfers all six barrels to the finish line in the fastest time wins.
Winners: Faysal & Moriah
Hold On for Me: Played in five heats. One team member begins suspended off the side of a building and must hang onto a bar for as long as possible. When they are about to drop, their partner must leap off a ledge and launch them towards a flag hanging behind them. Teams are disqualified if they are unable to grab the flag. The team that hangs on the longest, and is able to grab their flag, wins. 
Winners: Nelson & Nurys
Royal Relay: Played in two heats. Team members alternate turns swimming and rowing a boat to collect four crown pieces floating in a lake, then use them to assemble a crown. The team with the fastest time wins and also receives a cash prize of $5,000 each.
Winners: Jay & Michele
Down the Line: Played in two heats, teams must dig in their marked zone for two bags of puzzle pieces. Once teams find the first bag, one team member races to the end of a lake and spins a crank to extend the distance their partner can later zip line. After finding the second bag, the second team member must zip line into a lake and swim the remaining distance to reunite with their partner. Teams must then use the puzzle pieces to solve a word puzzle. The team with the fastest time wins.
Winners: Jay & Michele
Peaking Blinders: Teams race down a path to a pattern covered by blinds. There, one team member balances one-footed on a narrow pole to open the blinds and reveal the pattern for their partner to memorize. After the team member balancing falls off, teams must return to their board at the start and attempt to replicate their pattern, repeating this process until they correctly recreate the entire pattern. The first team to finish wins.
Winners: Nelson & Nurys
Double Trouble: One team member begins harnessed to the side of a speeding truck. They must traverse four cars speeding alongside the truck and collect a key from their partner in the last car before returning the key to their station, repeating this process for all four keys. The team with the fastest time wins.
Winners: Aneesa & Jordan
Haul or Nothing: Teams carry a heavy plank and undergo a six-mile race, completing three checkpoints along the way. At the first checkpoint, teams use their plank and three barrels to cross a field without touching the ground before transferring sandbags to the second checkpoint. At the second checkpoint, teams can place their sandbags on a trailing team's sled to sabotage them, before pulling their own sled across a field and stacking four cubes on top so each side shows four unique symbols. Once complete, teams transfer six tyres with cities labelled on them to the third checkpoint. At the third checkpoint, teams must transfer the tyres over a wall and arrange the cities from north to south before proceeding to the finish line. The first team to cross the finish line wins and becomes team captains as part of a format change for the season.
Winners: Faysal & Moriah
Last Life: Inspired by the upcoming film Puss in Boots: The Last Wish, each team begins with eight lives. One player at a time from each team face off on a balance beam and attempts to push their opponent into the water below. Each time a team member loses their matchup, they are eliminated from the challenge and their team loses a life. The team that diminishes all their opponent's lives wins and also receive invitations to the world premiere of Puss in Boots: The Last Wish.
Winners: Pink Team
Spin Class: Each team begin strapped to a giant wheel. After each spin, the team member the wheel lands on must answer a trivia question. If they answer correctly, they earn a point for their team; however, their team's wheel will spin for 30 more seconds if they answer incorrectly. The first team to score five points wins.
Winners: Orange Team
Chopper Drop: Six team members begin hanging onto a bar attached to a helicopter flying over a lake. As the helicopter flies over six targets, they must drop into a target to earn its point total before swimming the remaining distance to a platform in the middle of the lake. Smaller targets are worth more points and only two team members may drop through each target. Additionally, teams with greater than six members must have their remaining players swim to the platform from a designated point. The team that scores the most points, or with the faster swim time for all team members in the case of equal points, wins.
Winners: Yellow Team
Blind Faith: Each team must select one or two members to compete in four unrevealed challenges, based on cryptic symbols representing each challenge (target, puzzle, memory and bungee). The team with the fastest cumulative time for all four challenges wins.
Target: One team member must use a slingshot to fire balls and hit three out of seven distant targets to have their time stopped. However, after each miss they must also drink a foul-tasting smoothie before they can continue firing.
Puzzle: Two team members must transfer eight puzzle pieces across a field to their puzzle board and use them to solve a puzzle to have their time stopped.
Memory: One team member must run to an answer key, memorize it, and describe it to a second team member at the middle of a 300-foot field. The second team member must then replicate the key using tiles at the opposite end of the field to have their time stopped.
Bungee: Two team members begin attached to a bungee cord. They must both run towards and hold onto a bar simultaneously, as the resistance from the bungee cord pulls them back, to have their time stopped.
Winners: Pink Team
Takes Two to Tango: Two team members at a time begin harnessed on the side of a building and must cross a balance beam containing several obstacles before returning to the start. At each circular obstacle on the beam, they must also spin around before continuing. There is a ten-minute time limit before pairs time out and are dropped from the beam. The intra-team pair with the fastest time wins the challenge for their team.
Winners: Pink Team
Runaway Ride: Played one team at a time, teams begin in a bus filled with dozens of colored balls. As the bus swerves around a racetrack, teams must study a pattern printed on a board along the track, then recreate it by finding and arranging the required balls in the bus. The team with the most correctly-slotted balls in the fastest time wins.
Winners: Bananas & Nany
Frozen Senseless: One team member must feel through a covered box at one end of a course for three cubes with shapes on each face. They must then meet their partner at the middle of the course and describe the pattern to them so they can assemble the cubes using puzzle pieces at the other end of the course. However, teams must immerse themselves in an ice bath while communicating the descriptions. The first team to correctly assemble their cubes wins.
Winners: Devin & Tori

Zone games
You Move I Move: Teams must stand on and tilt two platforms to maneuver five balls through a table maze. The first team to move all five balls to the end of the maze wins.
Played by: Devin & Tori vs. Kailah & Sam
Memory Lane: Team members alternate turns flipping over two tiles at a time from their board of covered tiles. If the symbols on the tiles match, they can place them face up, otherwise they must leave the tiles face down. The first team to uncover all 24 tiles wins.
Played by: Horacio & Olivia vs. Tamara & Turbo
Double Decker: Team members begin on different levels of a double-decker hallway across from their opponents. The team members on the lower level must push a sliding bar to their opponent's side of the hallway while their opponent tries to do the same. Once one team member achieves this, the two players on the upper level repeat this process, with the teammate of the lower level's winner being released one second earlier. The first player on the upper level to push the bar to their opponent's side wins the round for their team. The first team to win two rounds wins.
Played by: Horacio & Olivia vs. Johnny & Ravyn
Flipping Wasted: One team member begins strapped to a board above a mud pit. Their partner must pull the board upright so they can reach and solve a puzzle. The first team to solve the puzzle wins.
Played by: Analyse & Tommy vs. Colleen & Kim
Give Me Some Slack: Team members begin on opposite sides of a climbing wall. The team member on the colored side must describe the design of the wall to their partner, who climbs their side to collect miniature wall pieces and recreate the design on a board. Additionally, team member's harnesses are connected so that each time one team member climbs, their partner descends and vice versa. The first team to correctly replicate their wall wins.
Played by: Colleen & Kim vs. Jakk & Laurel
In Your Face: Teams must transfer cinder blocks onto a box to release a set of balls. One team member must then throw the balls at ten targets of their opponent's faces while their partner tries to block their opponent's shots. The first team to hit all ten targets wins.
Played by: Aneesa & Jordan vs. Jakk & Laurel
Deep Web: Team members alternate turns descending a rope net tower to collect a puzzle piece at the bottom before climbing back to the top. After collecting all eight pieces, the first team to solve the puzzle wins.
Played by: Amber & Chauncey vs. Darrell & Veronica
Spun Out: One team member begins inside a giant wheel. They must roll the wheel back and forth so their partner, who is strapped to the outside of the wheel, can rearrange puzzle pieces on poles along the track to solve a puzzle similar to the Tower of Hanoi. The first team to solve the puzzle wins.
Played by: Horacio & Olivia vs. Jay & Michele
Breaking Barriers: Players must use tools (axe, bolt cutters or wrench) to break through varying walls enclosed in a hallway. The first player to break through all their walls and push the button in the middle of the hallway wins.
Played by: Horacio vs. Kenny
Pato Brawl: Players begin at the center of the Zone with both hands on a pato ball. The first player to wrestle the ball out of their opponent's hands two out of three times wins.
Played by: Amber vs. Nurys
Spearheaded: Players untangle chains enclosed in a cell to access nine spears which they must pull through the drywall of the cell to release. The first player to pull out all nine spears and place them at the finish line wins.
Played by: Faysal vs. Nelson
I Can See: Players must lift a heavy wall to reveal six scrambled words and unscramble them using letter tiles at their board. The first player to unscramble all six words, and push the button on the side of the board to verify their answer, wins. 
Played by: Moriah vs. Nany
Balls In: Played across three rounds; each round, players play both offense and defense. The offense player attempts to deposit a ball into a goal at the center of a ring while the defense player attempts to stop them by blocking them and knocking the ball out of bounds. Players then switch positions before the end of the round and repeat this process. The player with the most goals scored at the end of the third round wins.
Played by: Horacio vs. Jordan
Don't Let Me Down: Teams must roll a heavy cylinder up a steep ramp, past a marked line and hold it there for one minute. The first team to finish wins while the remaining two teams must compete in the following elimination round. 
Played by: Aneesa & Jordan vs. Faysal & Moriah vs. Kaycee & Kenny
Knot So Fast: Teams have 20 minutes to create as many knots as they can using a rope within a cubic structure. After those 20 minutes are up, teams switch positions and must untie their opponent's knots. The first team to untie their opponent's knots and drag the rope across the finish line wins.
Played by: Aneesa & Jordan vs. Kaycee & Kenny
Rumble Tumble: Played in male and female rounds, players begin tethered to their opponent. They must knock over their three stacks of blocks at the boundary of the Zone, while their opponent tries to do the same, to win the round for their team. The first team to win two rounds wins.
Played by: Amber & Chauncey vs. Aneesa & Jordan
Bridge It: Each team member must use three rungs to ascend a rope bridge to the top of a tower. Each time they drop a rung or fall off, they must restart. The first team to have both team members reach the top of the tower wins.
Played by: Bananas & Nany vs. Faysal & Moriah

Final Challenge
It was announced the remaining four teams would compete in a 100-hour Final Challenge. Teams began the Final Challenge by driving themselves to a campsite for the Overnight Stage of day one.

Day one
Overnight Stage: Teams must collectively cycle  on stationary bikes to reveal a code. They can then use the code to unlock a trunk of camping supplies before spending the night at the campsite.

Day two
Teams race to a series of stations and complete each station's challenge before continuing. The order that teams finish the day's checkpoints determines the order they depart the following day.
Station 1: Each team must throw ten bolas onto a structure from behind a line. After landing each second bola, they can assign a foul-tasting smoothie to another team. Once teams land all ten bolas, they must drink all the smoothies they currently have before proceeding to the next station.
Station 2: Teams must transfer 16 tyres labelled with the names of eliminated contestants from the season, one at a time, down a  track and arrange them on a pole in the order they were eliminated before proceeding to the next station.
Station 3: Teams must use a slingshot to fire balls and hit two distant targets before proceeding to the next station. The first team to complete this may also sabotage a trailing team by assigning them an additional two targets to hit before they can continue.
Eliminated: Horacio & Olivia (4th place – $38,000 awarded each)
Station 4: Teams swim through a swamp to collect bags of puzzle pieces at two platforms. After returning the puzzle pieces to their station, teams must then run down a path to view and memorize an answer key before recreating the key at their station using the puzzle pieces. Once complete, teams can proceed to the next station at a campsite.
Station 5 and Overnight Stage: Teams must solve a geometric puzzle before spending the night at the campsite.

Day three
Station 6: Teams must push a car down a track before proceeding to the next station at a campsite.
Station 7 and Overnight Stage: Teams must consume two plates of bread rolls, a plate of plain spaghetti and two large bowls of ice cream before spending the night at the campsite.

Day four
First stage: One team at a time, in the order decided by the winning team from the previous day, boards a helicopter is it flies over a field of targets. They must launch chalk bombs at the targets, attempting to hit as many as possible. The winning team from the previous day receive 25 chalk bombs to launch, second receives 20 bombs and third receives 15.  The team that hit the most targets wins the ability to select the departure order for the next stage.
Second stage: Teams must follow one of two paths in a dark corn maze to one of two campsites. Once all teams arrive at a campsite, a distant "Finale Zone" illuminates, which teams must race through the maze towards, departing in the order they arrived. The first team to arrive at the Zone are immune while the remaining two teams must participate in an Instant Elimination.
Winners: Devin & Tori
Instant Elimination ("Balls In"): Played in male and female rounds. Each round, team members of the designated gender play both offense and defense. The offense player has one attempt to deposit a ball into a goal at the center of a ring while the defense player attempts to stop them by blocking them and knocking the ball out of bounds. Players then switch roles and repeat the process before the end of the round. The first team to score three balls wins while the losers are eliminated from the Final Challenge.
Played by: Aneesa & Jordan vs. Bananas & Nany
Eliminated: Aneesa & Jordan (3rd place – $38,000 awarded each)

Day five
Level Up: The final two teams compete in a challenge at the Finale Zone to determine the champions of the season. Teams must complete four tasks to progress through four rooms, or "levels", in a hallway to reach a lever at the middle. The first team to pull the lever are declared the winners of Ride or Dies and receive $1 million.
Level 1: Teams must pull out nine spears enclosed in the drywall of the room to reach the next level.
Level 2: Teams must remove 200 cinderblocks from the room and use them to solve a puzzle outside the hallway before proceeding to the next level.
Level 3: Teams must use a battering ram to break through a wall then dig through a room filled with sand to reach the next level.
Level 4: Teams must remove chains tangled in the room to reach the lever in the middle of the hallway.
 Final results
Winners: Devin & Tori – $772,000 retained ($386,000 each)
Runners-up: Bananas & Nany – $38,000 awarded each

Game summary

Bold indicates the contestant or team pulled the dagger marked "safe", and saved a second contestant or team (where applicable)

Elimination progress

Competition key
 The contestant finished the Final Challenge and won
 The contestant finished the Final Challenge and lost
 The contestant was eliminated during the Final Challenge
 The contestant's team won the daily challenge and was immune from elimination
 The contestant won the daily challenge and became team captain
 The contestant was not selected for the Zone
 The contestant was exempt from elimination after surviving the team phase
 The contestant or team pulled the dagger marked "safe"
 The contestant was nominated for the Zone and saved at the Draw by the team who chose the safe dagger
 The contestant won the elimination round
 The contestant lost the elimination round and had to compete in the next elimination round
 The contestant lost the elimination round and was eliminated
 The contestant was medically removed from the competition
 The contestant withdrew from the competition
 The contestant was disqualified from the competition

Voting progress

Episodes

Reunion special
The two-part reunion special aired on February 22 and March 1, 2023 and was hosted by entertainment personality Maria Menounos. Cast members attended in London, England.

Notes

References

External links
 

2022 American television seasons
2023 American television seasons
Ride or Dies, The Challenge
Television shows filmed in Argentina
Television shows set in Argentina
Television series impacted by the COVID-19 pandemic